Johann Wilhelm of Jülich-Cleves-Berg (28 May 1562 – 25 March 1609) was the last Duke of Jülich-Cleves-Berg.

Biography

His parents were William the Rich, Duke of Jülich-Cleves-Berg (1516–1592) and Maria of Austria (1531–1581), a daughter of Ferdinand I, Holy Roman Emperor and Anna of Bohemia and Hungary. He grew up and was educated in Xanten. Johann Wilhelm became Bishop of Münster. However, after the unexpected death of his elder brother Karl Friedrich, Wilhelm was needed to succeed his father as Duke of Jülich-Cleves-Berg, a secular fief. He was also Count of Altena. The United Duchies of Jülich-Cleves-Berg was a combination of reichsfrei states within the Holy Roman Empire.

Johann Wilhelm was first married in 1585 to Jakobea of Baden (d. 1597), daughter of Philibert, Margrave of Baden. He was secondly married to Antonia of Lorraine (d. 1610), daughter of Charles III, Duke of Lorraine. Some believe that Johann Wilhelm also had a morganatic marriage prior to 1585 with Anna op den Graeff, with whom he had a son, Herman op den Graeff. No substantial evidence of any relation between the Op den Graeff and John William, Duke of Jülich-Cleves-Berg has ever been presented, so most likely that connection is non-existent.

Johann Wilhelm was subject to a serious mental illness, for which he was treated by the physician Francesco Maria Guazzo. He died on 25 March 1609, leaving no heirs to succeed him.

Upon Johann Wilhelm's death in 1609, his inheritance was claimed by the heirs of his two eldest sisters: the heir of Maria Eleonora of Cleves (1550–1608), the eldest sister and married to Albert Frederick, Duke of Prussia, was Anna of Prussia, the Electress of Brandenburg, a Protestant. The second sister was Anna of Cleves (1552–1632), married to Philipp Ludwig, Count Palatine of Neuburg, whose son and heir was the future Wolfgang Wilhelm, Count Palatine of Neuburg, a convert to Roman Catholicism in 1613.

The disputes of the epoch between Protestants and Catholics escalated, leading to the Thirty Years' War in 1618; the succession dispute became part of the war. Ultimately, Brandenburg received Cleves-Mark and Neuburg received Jülich-Berg, after the lands had been trampled under military several times and lost much of the fabled wealth so renowned in Duke Wilhelm's time. Among his court servants and employees were the composer Konrad Hagius.

Ancestry

References

External links

|-

1562 births
1609 deaths
House of La Marck
Prince-Bishops of Münster
Dukes of Berg
Counts of the Mark